Badbergen is a municipality in the district of Osnabrück, in Lower Saxony, Germany. It lies on the River Hase.

Subdivision
The municipality consists of the following villages: Badbergen, Grönloh, Groß Mimmelage, Grothe, Langen, Lechterke, Vehs, Wehdel, Wohld and Wulften.

References

Osnabrück (district)